Theodore Roszak (May 1, 1907 – September 2, 1981) was a Polish-American sculptor and painter. He was born in Posen, Prussia (German Empire), now Poznań, Poland, as a son of Polish parents, and emigrated to the United States at the age of two. From 1925 to 1926 he studied at the School of the Art Institute of Chicago, In 1930 he won the Logan Medal of the Arts, then moved to New York City to take classes at the National Academy of Design with George Luks and at Columbia University, where he studied logic and philosophy.

Roszak established a studio in New York City in 1932 and worked as an artist for the Works Progress Administration during the depression before going back to Chicago to teach at the Art Institute. He taught at Sarah Lawrence College throughout the 1940s and 1950s and at Columbia University from 1970 to 1973.  He was a participating artist at the documenta II in Kassel 1959 and at the Venice Biennale in 1960. Roszak's sculpture, at first closer to Constructivism and displaying an industrial aesthetic, changed after around 1946 to a more expressionistic style.

Roszak was affiliated  with the Skowhegan School of Painting and Sculpture , the National Institute of Arts and Letters,  the American Academy in Rome, and the National Academy of Design.  He served on the U.S. Commission of Fine Arts from 1963 to 1969.  He received the Logan Medal of the Arts (1930), a Tiffany Foundation Fellowship (1931), and the Eisendrath Award of the Art Institute of Chicago (1934).  Roszak was also an accomplished violinist, and liked to use musical references in his artworks. Roszak died in New York City, where he lived.

Roszak sculpted the  gilded aluminum eagle on the pediment of the former US Embassy in Grosvenor Square, London.

References

Further reading

External links
 Biography by Douglas Dreishpoon, Chief Curator, Albright-Knox Art Gallery
 Theodore Roszak papers at the Getty Research Institute

1907 births
1981 deaths
German emigrants to the United States
American people of Polish descent
Sarah Lawrence College faculty
School of the Art Institute of Chicago alumni
20th-century American sculptors
20th-century American male artists
American male sculptors